Claude Joseph Patrick Nunney  (24 December 1892 – 18 September 1918) was a Canadian soldier. Nunney was a recipient of the Victoria Cross, the highest award for gallantry in the face of the enemy that can be awarded to British and Commonwealth forces. Born in Hastings in East Sussex, he was sent to Canada as a home child.

Nunney was one of the seven Canadians to be awarded the Victoria Cross for their actions on one single day, 2 September 1918, for actions across the 30 km long Drocourt-Quéant Line near Arras, France. The other six were Bellenden Hutcheson, Arthur George Knight, William Henry Metcalf, Cyrus Wesley Peck, Walter Leigh Rayfield and John Francis Young.

Early life
Claude Joseph Patrick Nunney VC is buried in Aubigny Communal Cemetery Extension; he was born in Hastings as Stephen Sargent Claude Nunney. His father was William Percy Nunney and his mother Mary Nunney formerly Sargent at 42 Bexhill Road, Hastings on 19 July 1892. His father was born in Burford, Oxfordshire. Claude, as he was called within his family, was the fourth of eight children. The family left Hastings in 1895 and moved to Kentish Town, St Pancras, in London where his mother was to sadly die of food poisoning in February 1899. Two of Claude’s younger siblings died very young, and of the remaining six, five passed into the care of the Catholic Church. The three boys born in Hastings, Frederick George, Stephen Claude and Alfred Nunney all became "Home Children" in Canada.

Alfred and Stephen Nunney travelled together aboard the SS Tunisian in October 1905 to Quebec and then on to St George’s Home at Hintonburg, Ottawa, Ontario.  They were split up and sent to different families, Alfred moving to the Micksburg County, Renfrew, and Claude to North Lancaster.  Alfred was just twelve, as he was born on 29 September 1893, and Claude thirteen when they went in their separate directions.  Claude Nunney was placed with Mrs Donald Roy McDonald, where he lived and worked as a "Home Child". The term "Home Child" covered the young girls and boys sent as child emigrants by various agencies to Canada to start new lives.

Unbeknown to Claude, his brother George Nunney, who came as a Home Child to Canada in October 1904, was drowned on the 19 July 1908 in the Jock River, Jockvale. This is around 150 kilometres from North Lancaster. He was aged only 17. He had also been born in Hastings on 27 December 1890. He had been placed with Patrick Houlahan, a local farmer.

There has been some debate as to Nunney's origins. Whilst Nunney himself stated he was born in Dublin, Ireland, he was actually born in Hastings, England as Stephen Sargent Claude Nunney. Also it is claimed that Nunney did not become a Canadian citizen by naturalisation, but by becoming part of a child emigration scheme known as British Home Children.

Dave Lorente (Homechildren Canada) wrote in an article on Claude:

Nunney initially joined the Stormont, Dundas and Glengarry Highlanders in 1913, before joining the 38th Battalion (Ottawa), CEF and thus Nunney is claimed by both the SD&G Highlanders and the Cameron Highlanders.

Victoria Cross Award
Nunney was a member of the 38th (Ottawa) Battalion, Canadian Expeditionary Force which is perpetuated by the Cameron Highlanders of Ottawa (Duke of Edinburgh's Own). The Cameron Highlanders are a Canadian Forces Primary Reserve light infantry regiment located in the Cartier Square Drill Hall. Nunney was a private in the First World War when the following deeds took place for which he was awarded the VC:

He died aged 25, 16 days after receiving what proved to be mortal wounds and was buried at Aubigny Communal Cemetery Extension, near Aubigny-en-Artois (Grave reference number IV. B. 39).

The Medal
All of Nunney's medals (he had earlier in the war won the Military Medal and the Distinguished Conduct Medal at the Battle of Vimy Ridge), including his VC are displayed above the fireplace at Cornwall Armoury in Cornwall, Ontario.

References

Further reading 
The Register of the Victoria Cross (1981, 1988 and 1997)

Ireland's VCs  (Dept of Economic Development, 1995)
Monuments to Courage (David Harvey, 1999)
Irish Winners of the Victoria Cross (Richard Doherty & David Truesdale, 2000)

External links
Claude Nunney VC DCM MM (Official Page for Claude Nunney by Peter Silk) 
Claude Nunney's digitized service file 
Claude Joseph Patrick Nunney on the Canadian Virtual War Memorial
 Legion Magazine-The Magnificent Seven
Ontario Plaques – Claude J.P. Nunney

1892 births
1918 deaths
Canadian World War I recipients of the Victoria Cross
British emigrants to Canada
People from Hastings
Canadian recipients of the Distinguished Conduct Medal
Canadian recipients of the Military Medal
Canadian military personnel killed in World War I
Canadian Expeditionary Force soldiers
Military personnel from Sussex